Anthony Fisher is the ninth Archbishop of Sydney, the former Bishop of Parramatta, and a bioethicist.

Anthony or Antony Fisher may also refer to:

 Antony Fisher (1915–1988), British economist
 Anthony Corey Fisher (born 1988), American-born Georgian professional basketball player
 Anthony Fisher (basketball, born 1986), American professional basketball player
 Anthony Fisher (basketball, born 1994), Australian professional basketball player
 Anthony Fisher (Massachusetts politician), member of the Great and General Court

See also 
 Tony Fisher (disambiguation)
 Anthony Fischer, Swiss musician with Pfuri Gorps & Kniri
 Anthony Charles-Fisher, a character in Six Feet Under